Aslı Tandoğan (born 2 April 1979) is a Turkish actress and professional harpist. Tandoğan graduated from Music department of Hacettepe University State Conservatory. First, she chose violin at conservatory for a year, then she chose harp. Conservatory education started since childhood and continued for 10 years. She later joined Antalya Symphony Orchestra. Her father and aunt are ballet dancers. Her mother is painter.

Tandoğan is best known for starring as one of the main characters, Lamia, series based of classic novel Dudaktan Kalbe ("From the Lips to the Heart" ). She also co-starred in the movie Kabadayı as Karaca. Also, she had guest roles in hit series surreal comedy Leyla ile Mecnun, hit crime series Behzat Ç and historical series Muhteşem Yüzyıl: Kösem

She founded "Bana Göz Kulak Ol" with Özge Özder. She can play wing-chun, archery, diving, climbing, tennis, horse riding, ski. She speaks Chinese, English, Spanish, Russian at different levels.

Filmography

References

External links 

1979 births
21st-century Turkish actresses
Actresses from Ankara
Hacettepe University alumni
Living people
Turkish film actresses
Turkish television actresses